Artur Akopovich Grigoryan (born 29 January 1985) is a Russian-Armenian former football player.

Club career 
Grigoryan previously played for FC Metallurg Lipetsk in the Russian First Division.

External links 
 
 

1985 births
People from Akhaltsikhe
Georgian people of Armenian descent
Armenian footballers
Footballers from Georgia (country)
Russian sportspeople of Armenian descent
Living people
Russian footballers
Association football forwards
Russian expatriate footballers
Expatriate footballers in Montenegro
Expatriate footballers in Belarus
FC Chernomorets Novorossiysk players
FK Bokelj players
FC Metallurg Lipetsk players
FC Salyut Belgorod players
FC Dnepr Mogilev players
FC Dynamo Stavropol players
Belarusian Premier League players